LCD Soundsystem is an American rock band from Brooklyn, New York, formed in 2002 by James Murphy, co-founder of DFA Records. The band comprises Murphy (vocals, various instruments), Nancy Whang (synthesizer, keyboards, vocals), Pat Mahoney (drums), Tyler Pope (bass, guitar, synthesizer), Al Doyle (guitar, synthesizer, percussion), Matt Thornley (guitar, synthesizer, percussion), and Korey Richey (synthesizer, piano, percussion). They are currently signed to both DFA and Columbia Records.

The band began by recording and releasing multiple singles from 2002 to 2004, the first of which was "Losing My Edge", one of their signature songs. This led up to the release of their 2005 self-titled debut studio album. It garnered critical acclaim and a Grammy Award nomination for Best Electronic/Dance Album. Their single "Daft Punk Is Playing at My House", which has become the band's most commercially successful single, received a Grammy nomination for Best Dance Recording. In the following year, LCD Soundsystem recorded and released "45:33", a forty-five minute-long composition that was a specially made "workout track" for Nike's Nike+ Original Run series. In 2007, the band released their second studio album, Sound of Silver, to critical acclaim and another Grammy nomination for Best Electronic/Dance Album.

In 2010, LCD Soundsystem released their third studio album, This Is Happening, which became their first top-ten album in the United States. In February 2011, the band posted a statement on its website announcing that it was disbanding following a large farewell concert at Madison Square Garden on April 2, 2011. The farewell concert is chronicled in the documentary film Shut Up and Play the Hits and was also made available as a live album titled The Long Goodbye, in April 2014.

After a series of rumors hinting at a possible reunion, in December 2015 the band released their first single in five years, "Christmas Will Break Your Heart". LCD Soundsystem later confirmed their reunion and announced an expanded tour, including appearances at several high-profile music festivals, and released their fourth studio album American Dream in September 2017. It went on to become their first number-one album in the United States. The album was nominated for Best Alternative Music Album at the 60th Annual Grammy Awards and the single "Tonite" won for Best Dance Recording.

History

Early singles and self-titled album (2002–2005)

James Murphy founded LCD Soundsystem during 2002 in the New York City borough of Brooklyn. The "LCD" part of the band's name stands for "Liquid Christmas Display", a play on "liquid-crystal display", and originated from the earliest iteration of the band during a live performance at a Brooklyn Christmas party where bassist Murphy and drummer Pat Mahoney were covering songs by Liquid Liquid.

They began by releasing a string of singles under DFA Records, which was co-founded by Murphy. They gained attention with their first single, "Losing My Edge", which peaked at number 115 in the UK. Described as "an eight-minute, laugh-out-loud funny dissection of cool over a dirty electronic beat"; the single became an underground dance favorite. This was followed by the single "Give It Up", and in the following year, "Yeah" and "Movement". The latter two peaked at number 77 and number 52 in the UK, respectively.

LCD Soundsystem released their eponymous debut studio album in January 2005 to critical acclaim. For the CD version, the first disc contains the album and the second contains a compilation of previous singles. They later released the single "Daft Punk Is Playing at My House" the following month, which became their first UK top 40 hit, peaking at number 29, as well as their most commercially successful single, charting in Australia, Belgium, and the Netherlands. The band toured with M.I.A. following the release of the album. In June 2005, the band covered a Siouxsie and the Banshees song, "Slowdive" for the B-side of their single "Disco Infiltrator".

In December 2005, the group received nominations for two Grammy awards, one for Best Electronic/Dance Album with their self-titled album and one for Best Dance Recording with "Daft Punk Is Playing at My House." Their self-titled debut was also placed at number 94 of Amazon.com's "Top 100 Editor's Picks" of 2005.

"45:33" and Sound of Silver (2006–2008)

In October 2006, LCD Soundsystem released a composition entitled "45:33", as part of Nike's Original Run series. It was made available for download from iTunes. Despite its name, the track is actually 45 minutes and 58 seconds long—the title is a reference to vinyl speeds (33 and 45 RPM)—and was claimed to "reward and push at good intervals of a run". However, it was later revealed that this was not the case, but that Murphy merely wanted the opportunity to create a long piece of music, akin to E2-E4 by Manuel Göttsching.

LCD Soundsystem's second studio album, Sound of Silver, was released on March 20, 2007, to critical acclaim. Praise included Mixmag awarding it the title Album of the Month, a 9.2 score from Pitchfork and a 5-star review from The Guardian. The album release was preceded by the single "North American Scum", which was released in February 2007. LCD Soundsystem's subsequent single "All My Friends" included covers of the song by Franz Ferdinand and former Velvet Underground member John Cale. The digital download "All My Friends" EP also includes a cover of the early Joy Division song "No Love Lost". In September 2007, the A Bunch of Stuff EP was released and the band went on tour with Arcade Fire. Late in 2007, the band released "Someone Great" as the third single from Sound of Silver and re-released "45:33" on CD and vinyl through DFA Records. In December 2007, there was a release of a 12-inch record containing b-sides from European singles for the North American market entitled Confuse the Marketplace.

Also in December 2007, the band received a Grammy nomination for Best Electronic/Dance Album with Sound of Silver. The album was also named the best album of 2007 by publications such as The Guardian, Uncut and Drowned in Sound. The album was also nominated for the 2007 Shortlist Prize, where it lost out to The Reminder by Feist. Time magazine named "All My Friends" one of The 10 Best Songs of 2007, ranking it at number 4. Writer Josh Tyrangiel praised the "magic" in the song, saying that the song's "straightforward repetition of the same guitar, keyboard and bass lines, combined with lyrics about life without regret, and life with all kinds of regrets pays off with a punch about what we lose as we get older." The track was later named the second best song of the 2000s by Pitchfork.

After finishing touring for Sound of Silver the band recorded and released a song entitled "Big Ideas" on the soundtrack of the film 21. This song was ranked number 63 on Rolling Stones list of the 100 Best Songs of 2008.

This Is Happening and breakup (2009–2011)

On November 18, 2008, Al Doyle seemed to suggest in an interview with 6 Music that the band would soon be discontinued. However, the following day both Doyle and James Murphy quashed this rumor, with Murphy indicating a new LCD Soundsystem album was on the way. Murphy began recording in the summer of 2009 in Los Angeles. Possible song titles mentioned at that time included "Why Do You Hate Music?" and "Love in LA". For the 2009 Record Store Day the band released a cover of Suicide member Alan Vega's song "Bye Bye Bayou".

On February 23, 2010, the LCD Soundsystem website announced that the album had been completed. The first single was set to be "Drunk Girls" and on March 25, a stream of the song was put on music site One Thirty BPM. The title of the album and the cover were revealed on the DFA site on March 30. The album, titled This Is Happening, was released in the UK on May 17, 2010 and in the U.S. on May 18, 2010. Prior to the release Murphy promised that it will be "definitely better than the other two." Murphy stated that it was likely to be the last LCD Soundsystem album. The band performed two secret gigs in New York on April 9 and April 12, 2010, at the Music Hall of Williamsburg and Webster Hall in New York City. Murphy made an impassioned plea with fans and industry attendees at the New York gig not to leak the album to the internet in advance of the May 17 release date. It was reported in the NME that Murphy went down on his knees onstage and stated:

If you got a copy of the record early and you feel like sharing it with the rest of the world, then please don't ... We spent two years making this record and we want to put it out when we want to put it out. I don't care about money – after it comes out, give it to whoever you want for free but until then, keep it to yourself.

For the 2010 edition of Record Store Day, the band released 1000 copies of a single-sided 12" single of This Is Happening track "Pow Pow". When speaking to The Quietus in August, Murphy insisted that LCD Soundsystem would continue to record music, stating: "We'll do some 12"s and things like that. I just need to get away from it being a big thing".

On February 8, 2011, LCD Soundsystem announced on its website that it would be playing its last show on April 2 at Madison Square Garden in New York City. When tickets went on pre-sale and sale, there were widespread problems with availability and online ordering. Following the immediate sale of all available tickets, LCD Soundsystem announced that they would be playing four warm-up shows at New York's Terminal 5. The setlists at those shows were nearly identical to the setlist of the final show at Madison Square Garden. The final song performed by LCD Soundsystem at the farewell show was "New York, I Love You but You're Bringing Me Down". The show lasted almost four hours with appearances by Arcade Fire, Reggie Watts and others.

Post-breakup (2011–2014)

LCD Soundsystem covered the Franz Ferdinand song "Live Alone" for the Franz Ferdinand Covers EP. The cover was released as a single through the Domino Recording Company on April 11, 2011. On April 12, 2011, Murphy confirmed, via LCD Soundsystem's Facebook page, the release of the final show on DVD, with a better quality than the stream offered by Pitchfork. In addition, a documentary called Shut Up and Play the Hits, chronicling James Murphy during the 48 hours before, during, and after the final show, screened at the 2012 Sundance Film Festival and later given limited release in select theaters. On March 5, 2013, LCD Soundsystem was named one of Rolling Stone's New Immortals—"currently active (or relatively recently defunct) artists who [they] think will stand the test of time." On April 19, 2014, the definitive live recording of the farewell show, The Long Goodbye: LCD Soundsystem Live at Madison Square Garden, was released in a 5-box vinyl edition.

Reunion: American Dream and Electric Lady Sessions (2015–2019)

In October 2015, a Consequence of Sound article reported that "multiple sources" confirmed that LCD Soundsystem would be reuniting in 2016 and headlining "high-profile music festivals in the US and UK". This report was eventually confirmed by Billboard, but later that day, DFA Records label manager Kris Petersen stated that LCD Soundsystem would not be reuniting. DFA co-founder Jonathan Galkin also reaffirmed this in a Pitchfork article.

On December 24, 2015, LCD Soundsystem released the Christmas-themed track "Christmas Will Break Your Heart", the band's first single in five years. Regarded as a "depressing Christmas song" that James Murphy had been singing to himself for years, the song was recorded during 2015 after Murphy had gotten past band members Al Doyle, Pat Mahoney, Nancy Whang and Tyler Pope to come to DFA Studios in New York City to record the track. It was released as both a digital download and 7-inch vinyl. Both Consequence of Sound and Billboard again stated, after the release of the song, that "multiple sources" can confirm that LCD Soundsystem would reunite in 2016.

The band's reunion was confirmed on January 4, 2016, when it was announced that LCD Soundsystem would be headlining the 2016 Coachella Festival. The following day, the band announced that they would be releasing a new studio album some time in 2016. Murphy, who worked on the album Blackstar, stated that David Bowie helped convince him to reassemble the band before Bowie's death in January 2016. On February 13, it was reported that LCD Soundsystem had signed with Columbia Records. On March 23, it was announced that the band would also be headlining the 2016 Lollapalooza Festival. The band performed two shows at Webster Hall in East Village, Manhattan on March 27 and 28, marking their first shows in almost five years. The event had a ticket distribution system in the form of a lottery. During the rest of 2016, the band headlined the Outside Lands, Austin City Limits, Bonnaroo, LouFest, and Wayhome festivals.

In August 2016, the band canceled tour dates for shows in Asia and Australia in order to complete work on the album. Although plans were made to release the record in 2016, it was suggested that the release date would be moved into the following year, as the recording was predicted to take another few months. LCD Soundsystem performed their first show of 2017 at the then-recently opened venue Brooklyn Steel on April 6. During their performance, they premiered three new songs titled "Tonite", "Call the Police", and "American Dream" during the first encore of their set. A fourth new song, "Emotional Haircut", was performed during a later show at Brooklyn Steel. On May 5, the band released "Call the Police" and "American Dream" together as a digital double A-side single. Accompanying the single was a lengthy post on their Facebook page, which also included an update regarding the progress of their upcoming studio album. The band performed the two songs during the May 6 episode of Saturday Night Lives 42nd season. On June 19, the band revealed that the title of their fourth studio album would be American Dream and that it would be released on September 1 through Columbia Records and DFA Records. The tracklist for the album was also revealed as well as dates for a world tour. American Dream released to critical acclaim following the release of several singles. The album was nominated for Best Alternative Music Album and the song "Tonite" won Best Dance Recording at the 2018 Grammy Awards, earning the band their first ever Grammy win.

The band performed three songs live at Electric Lady Studios as part of a Spotify Singles release, released on September 12, 2018, with the songs being "Tonite", "Home" (from This Is Happening), and a cover of the Chic song "I Want Your Love". Later, on November 2, the band released a cover of the Heaven 17 song "(We Don't Need This) Fascist Groove Thang" and teased a full live album recorded at the same studio, titled Electric Lady Sessions.

Holiday Special and concert residencies (2020–present)
During his appearance on Marc Maron's WTF with Marc Maron podcast in July 2021, Murphy revealed that LCD Soundsystem had not worked on any music during the COVID-19 pandemic and were on a "full hiatus". He added that the band were at the point of their cycle where they "[return] to normal life completely" and that they had no plans to tour until they release another album. Regarding when the band plans to begin recording again, he stated "we'll figure something out when the time is right". The band's hiatus effectively ended in October 2021, following their announcement of a 20-date residency at Brooklyn Steel from late November to late December 2021. Synth player Gavilán Rayna Russom revealed in a November 2021 interview with Pitchfork that she decided against performing during the Brooklyn Steel shows and had permanently left LCD Soundsystem, citing an increased desire to work on other projects. Multi-instrumentalist Matt Thornley was also absent during the shows. The band picked up two new synth players for the residency: Abby Echiverri and Nick Millhiser, the latter being a member of fellow DFA Records signees Holy Ghost!. The residency ended prematurely as the band canceled the final three dates, from December 19–21, due to a large increase of COVID-19 Omicron variant cases in New York City. Though they had planned on continuing through the end of the residency despite the rise in cases, the band announced on December 17 that they would cancel the remaining shows and offer refunds if enough concert attendees backed out of attending, which was the end result.

On December 22, Amazon Music aired The LCD Soundsystem Holiday Special through their Twitch channel. The special was a one-off episode of a 1990s-style sitcom titled All My Friends, with comedians and actors portraying LCD Soundsystem members, including Eric Wareheim, the writer and director of the episode, playing James Murphy, Macaulay Culkin playing Pat Mahoney, and Christine Ko playing Nancy Whang. The episode was interspersed with footage from a prerecorded live performance by the band. Wareheim stated that he and Murphy had been developing the sitcom project for 15 years. The special was produced during November and December 2021; the live performance was filmed in New York City with the sitcom episode being filmed immediately afterward in Los Angeles, the latter over a span of two days. Wareheim and Murphy both expressed amazement at Amazon Music's willingness to air the episode.

LCD Soundsystem was the musical guest for the February 26, 2022, episode of Saturday Night Lives 47th season, which was hosted by John Mulaney. Breaking with tradition of musical guests performing new material, the band performed the songs "Thrills" and "Yr City's a Sucker" from their debut studio album for the episode. Additionally, the band collectively appeared in a sketch during the episode, where they portrayed members of the Guardian Angels. In March 2022, Murphy posted an update to the band's Facebook page explaining their direction for 2022, stating that the band collectively desired playing live shows without having to promote an album. Murphy, Whang, Mahoney, and Pope reunited with former member Phil Mossman to perform together as LCD Soundsystem at a DFA Records 20th anniversary show on March 26. LCD Soundsystem began their 2022 run of concert residencies in March 2022 at Franklin Music Hall in Philadelphia, Pennsylvania, lasting four nights. Through the rest of the year, they performed a four-night residency at the Roadrunner in Boston, Massachusetts, a six-night residency at the O2 Academy in Brixton, London, and an eight-night residency at the Fox Oakland Theatre and Warfield Theatre in the San Francisco Bay Area. Also in August, Variety reported that the band had contributed to the soundtrack for Noah Baumbach's 2022 film White Noise with a new song titled "New Body Rhumba". It was released as a single on September 30, 2022. On the same day, the band announced another 20-date residency at Brooklyn Steel, running from mid-November through December 2022.

On January 31, 2023, AEG (Anschutz Entertainment Group) Presents announced that the band would be one of three headline acts at the inaugural Re:SET Concert Series.

Musical style
Musically, LCD Soundsystem has been described as dance-punk and dance-rock, electronic rock and electronica, art rock, alternative dance, post-punk revival, and indie rock.

Awards and nominations

Grammy Awards

|-
| rowspan=2|2006
| "Daft Punk Is Playing At My House"
| Best Dance Recording
| 
|-
| LCD Soundsystem
| rowspan=2|Best Electronic/Dance Album
| 
|-
| 2008
| Sound of Silver
| 
|-
| rowspan=2|2018
| "Tonite"
| Best Dance Recording
| 
|-
| American Dream
| Best Alternative Music Album
|

Rober Awards Music Poll

|-
| 2007
| "Someone Great"
| Best Dance Anthem
| 
|-
| 2008
| James Murphy
| Best Male Artist  
| 
|-
| rowspan=2|2010
| "I Can Change"
| Best Dance Anthem
| 
|-
| rowspan=4|Themselves 
| Best Electronica 
| 
|-
| rowspan=5|2017
| Best Group or Duo
| 
|-
| Comeback of the Year 
| 
|-
| Best Live Artist 
| 
|-
| American Dream
| Album of the Year 
| 
|-
| "American Dream"
| Song of the Year 
| 
|-
| 2018
| "(We Don't Need This) Fascist Groove Thang"
| Best Cover Version
|

Other Awards
{| class=wikitable
|-
! Year !! Awards !! Work !! Category !! Result
|-
| 2005
| MVPA Awards
| "Daft Punk Is Playing at My House"
| Best Electronic Video
| 
|-
| rowspan=2|2007
| Shortlist Music Prize
| rowspan=2|Sound of Silver
| Album of the Year 
| 
|-
| Best Art Vinyl
| Best Vinyl Art
| 
|-
| 2008
| MVPA Awards
| "North American Scum"
| Best Electronic Video
| 
|- 
| 2010
| UK Music Video Awards
| "Drunk Girls"
| Best Indie/Alternative Video
| 
|-
| rowspan=8|2011
| rowspan=4|New York Music Awards
| Themselves
| Band of the Year 
| 
|-
| rowspan=2|This is Happening
| Album of the Year 
| 
|-
| Best Pop/Electronic Album
| 
|-
| "Drunk Girls"
| Best Rock Video
| 
|-
| rowspan=2|International Dance Music Awards
| "I Can Change"
| Best Underground Dance Track
| 
|-
| rowspan=3|Themselves 
| Best Dance Artist (Group)
| 
|-
| mtvU Woodie Awards
| Woodie of the Year 
| 
|-
| Webby Awards
| Artist of the Year 
| 
|-
| 2012
| UK Music Video Awards
| rowspan=2|Shut Up and Play the Hits
| Best Live Music Coverage
| 
|-
| 2013
| NME Awards
| Best Music Film
| 
|-
| rowspan=3|2018
| UK Music Video Awards
| "Tonite"
| Best Interactive Video
| 
|-
| Brit Awards
| rowspan=2|Themselves
| Best International Group
| 
|-
| NME Awards
| Best Live Band
| 
|-
| rowspan=2|2019
| Classic Pop Reader Awards
| rowspan=2|"Oh Baby"
| Video of the Year
| 
|-
| Music Video Festival
| Best Music Video
|

Band members

Members and dates are based on single and album credits from the band's discography.

Official members
 James Murphy – vocals, synths, guitar, bass, drums, percussion, drum machine, production 
 Nancy Whang – vocals, keyboards, synths 
 Pat Mahoney – drums, percussion, drum machine, claps, synths, vocals 
 Tyler Pope – bass, guitar, synths, claps, drum machine 
 Al Doyle – guitar, percussion, synths, bass 
 Korey Richey – percussion, synths, piano, vocals 

Former members
 Phil Mossman – guitar, percussion 
 Matt Thornley – guitar, percussion, piano, synth, drum machine 
 Gavilán Rayna Russom – synths, vocals 

Current touring members
 Abby Echiverri – synths, guitar, percussion, vocals 
 Nick Millhiser – synths, percussion, vocals 

Former touring members
 Jerry Fuchs – drums, percussion 
 J. D. Mark – guitar 
 Phil Skarich – bass 
 David Scott Stone – guitar, percussion, synths, vocals

Timeline

Discography

LCD Soundsystem (2005)
45:33 (2006)
Sound of Silver (2007)
This Is Happening (2010)
American Dream (2017)

References

External links

 Interview with Fresh Air, NPR, 2010
 Interview with musicOMH.com, 2007
 Interview with DJ Times, 2005
 Videos of James Murphy Press Conference (April 6, 2007)
 James Murphy podcast on Times Online

2001 establishments in New York City
2011 disestablishments in New York (state)
Alternative dance musical groups
American electronic rock musical groups
Capitol Records artists
Columbia Records artists
Dance-punk musical groups
DFA Records artists
Electronic music groups from New York (state)
Grammy Award winners for dance and electronic music
Indie rock musical groups from New York (state)
Musical groups disestablished in 2011
Musical groups established in 2001
Musical groups from Brooklyn
Musical groups reestablished in 2015
Post-punk revival music groups
Virgin Records artists
Warner Records artists